Greenville Township is one of twenty-five townships in Bureau County, Illinois, USA. As of the 2020 census, its population was 353 and it contained 153 housing units.

Geography

Cities
 New Bedford

Unincorporated towns
 Normandy

Cemeteries
The township contains three cemeteries:
 Bowen
 Fairfield
 New Bedford Chapel

Major highways
  Illinois Route 40
  Illinois Route 92

Demographics
As of the 2020 census there were 353 people, 167 households, and 147 families residing in the township. The racial makeup of the township was 96.88% White, 0.00% African American, 0.00% Native American, 0.00% Asian, 0.00% Pacific Islander, 0.28% from other races, and 2.83% from two or more races. Hispanic or Latino of any race were 1.13% of the population.

There were 167 households, out of which 53.30% had children under the age of 18 living with them, 38.92% were married couples living together, 47.31% had a female householder with no spouse present, and 11.98% were non-families. 11.40% of all households were made up of individuals, and 4.80% had someone living alone who was 65 years of age or older. The average household size was 1.83 and the average family size was 1.93.

The township's age distribution consisted of 15.7% under the age of 18, 10.1% from 18 to 24, 30.4% from 25 to 44, 16.7% from 45 to 64, and 27.1% who were 65 years of age or older. The median age was 42.8 years. For every 100 females, there were 93.7 males. For every 100 females age 18 and over, there were 63.3 males.

Males had a median income of $40,357 versus $19,172 for females. The per capita income for the township was $24,320. About 54.4% of families and 46.7% of the population were below the poverty line, including 83.3% of those under age 18 and 8.4% of those age 65 or over.

School districts
 Bureau Valley Community Unit School District 340

Political districts
 Illinois's 14th congressional district
 State House District 74
 State Senate District 37

References
 
 US Census Bureau 2007 TIGER/Line Shapefiles
 United States National Atlas

External links
 City-Data.com
 Illinois State Archives

Townships in Bureau County, Illinois
Populated places established in 1849
Townships in Illinois
1849 establishments in Illinois